Yoga Perera was a champion Sri Lankan motor car and Go-cart racing racing driver.

Early childhood
Yoga Perera was educated at Nalanda College Colombo.

Motor racing
Yoga commenced his racing career in 1981 when he participated in the Katukurunda Novices Meet. In 1986 he represented Sri Lanka Motor Cycle Club and was the first driving a Charade and the following year he was placed second in Katukurunda Races with his mini. In 1987 Yoga Perera with his mini at the Mahagastota Hill Climb became the winner and repeated it again driving in the Radella Hill Climb by also recording the fastest time.

In 1989, Perera recorded the fastest timing for day at Radella Speed Hill Club competing including formula cars. He secured 3rd in Gulf Kart Championships held in Dubai in 1989 and also participated in the Malaysian Kart Championship on an invitation. He was a member of the Sri Lanka National Team for Motor Racing at the time. In 1995 Yoga won the Mini Championship at Sriperempatu Track in Madras, India.

Other activities
Yoga also holds a degree in Business Management is a businessman In Sri Lanka, Dubai and in South Africa and is the owner/chairman and managing director of Autoland Car Sales.

He served as a director on the board of Airport and Aviation Services from 2010 to 2015.

Also he is the president of Sri Lanka Auto-sports Drivers Association (SLADA).

He served as a board director of Sri Lanka Telecom from 2008 to 2010.

Yoga is a past president of Sri Lanka Association of Racing Drivers and Riders (SLARDAR).

General references 

 

 

 

 

 

Living people
Alumni of Nalanda College, Colombo
Sinhalese businesspeople
Sri Lankan Buddhists
1956 births